Phyllonorycter cytisus is a moth of the family Gracillariidae. It is known from Sardinia.

The larvae feed on Cytisus villosus. They mine the leaves of their host plant.

References

cytisus
Moths described in 1952
Endemic fauna of Italy
Moths of Europe